Fausto Ruy Pinato (born 1 June 1977) is a Brazilian politician and lawyer. He has spent his political career representing São Paulo, having served as federal deputy representative since 2015.

Personal life
He was a lawyer prior to entering politics. His brother Gustavo Pinato is a member of the São Paulo state senate, serving as a councilman representing Fernandópolis. He is a member of the Christian Congregation in Brazil and is a musician in the church.

Political career
Pinato was elected federal deputy of São Paulo in 2014, after being endorsed by his predecessor Celso Russomanno for the Brazil Republican party candidate. Pinato was investigated during Operation Car Wash for allegedly taking R$ 117 thousand in bribes from Brazilian company Queiroz Galvão during his election campaign. Pinato was initially part of an ethics committee investigation into Eduardo Cunha, but he resigned early on due to switching his party allegiance from the PRB to the PP.  

Pinato voted in favor of the impeachment against then-president Dilma Rousseff and political reformation. He would later vote in against opening a corruption investigation against Rousseff's successor Michel Temer, and voted in favor of the 2017 Brazilian labor reforms.

References

1977 births
Living people
People from Fernandópolis
20th-century Brazilian lawyers
Brazilian Pentecostals
Members of the Christian Congregation (Pentecostal)
Republicans (Brazil) politicians
Progressistas politicians
Members of the Chamber of Deputies (Brazil) from São Paulo